Harald Nickel (21 July 1953 – 4 August 2019) was a German footballer who played as a forward.

Club career 
Nickel spent four seasons in the Bundesliga with Arminia Bielefeld, Eintracht Braunschweig, and Borussia Mönchengladbach. Additionally, he played for several clubs in Belgium, as well as FC Basel in Switzerland.

International career 
Nickel was also capped three times for West Germany.

Honours
Borussia Mönchengladbach
 UEFA Cup runner-up: 1979–80

Individual
 German Goal of the Year award: 1979
 UEFA Cup top scorer: 1979–80
 Belgian First Division top scorer: 1977–78

References

External links
 
 
 
 

1953 births
2019 deaths
People from Minden-Lübbecke
Sportspeople from Detmold (region)
German footballers
Footballers from North Rhine-Westphalia
Association football forwards
Germany international footballers
Germany B international footballers
Belgian Pro League players
Bundesliga players
Arminia Bielefeld players
K.V. Kortrijk players
Standard Liège players
Eintracht Braunschweig players
Borussia Mönchengladbach players
FC Basel players
West German footballers
West German expatriate sportspeople in Belgium
Expatriate footballers in Belgium
West German expatriate sportspeople in Switzerland
Expatriate footballers in Switzerland
Deaths from cancer in Germany
West German expatriate footballers